Sipuati Airport  is a public use airport near Sipuati in the Tarija Department of Bolivia.

See also

Transport in Bolivia
List of airports in Bolivia

References

External links 
OpenStreetMap - Sipuati
OurAirports - Sipuati
Fallingrain - Sipuati Airport

Airports in Tarija Department